John Shelby is a baseball player.

John Shelby may also refer to:

John Shelby (Peaky Blinders)

See also
John Shelby Spong